Evening at the Djurgarden (Swedish: Djurgårdskvällar) is a 1946 Swedish comedy film directed by Rolf Husberg and starring Adolf Jahr, Emy Hagman and Nils Ericsson. It was shot at the Centrumateljéerna Studios in Stockholm. The film's sets were designed by the art director Nils Svenwall.

Cast
 Adolf Jahr as 	Affe Grönlund
 Emy Hagman as 	Vera Valli
 Nils Ericsson as Felix Winter 
 Lasse Krantz as Carl Maxon
 Douglas Håge as 	Johnny Maxon
 John Botvid as 	Algot Blomster
 Naima Wifstrand as 	Mrs. Bender
 Agneta Lagerfeldt as 	Elsie Nord
 Ingrid Björk as 	Inga Grönlund
 Henrik Schildt as Arne Grönlund
 Harrine Cederholm as 	Sonja
 Rune Stylander as 	Roffe
 Peter Lindgren as 	Nicke
 Wiktor Andersson as 	Barker at Gröna Lund 
 Carl Andersson as 	Poker player
 Sven Bergvall as Judge
 Julie Bernby as 	Jonny's lady friend 
 John W. Björling as 	Poker player 
 Mats Björne as 	Police secretary 
 Gillis Blom as 	Arne's defence lawyer
 Edvard Danielsson as 	District attorney 
 Sven Ericsson as 	Man in the ghost tunnel 
 Gustaf Färingborg as 	Police interrogating Arne 
 Sigge Fürst as 	Man 
 Tage Johansson as 	Barker 
 Gösta Kjellertz as 	Bellman 
 Uno Larsson as Older man at Gröna Lund 
 Carin Lundquist as Miss Greta, waitress 
 Cécile Ossbahr as 	Woman 
 Gösta Qvist as 	Court visitor 
 Ulla Sallert as 	Ulla Winbladh 
 Monica Schildt as 	Miss Danje 
 Mauritz Strömbom as Poker player 
 Karin Windahl as Court visitor

References

Bibliography 
 Krawc, Alfred. International Directory of Cinematographers, Set- and Costume Designers in Film: Denmark, Finland, Norway, Sweden (from the beginnings to 1984). Saur, 1986.

External links 
 

1946 films
1946 comedy films
Swedish comedy films
1940s Swedish-language films
Swedish black-and-white films
Films directed by Rolf Husberg
1940s Swedish films